John Forsyth may refer to:

 John Forsyth (clothier), Canadian shirtmaker
 John Forsyth (footballer) (born 1918), Scottish footballer
 John Forsyth (general) (1867–1928), Australian major general 
 John Forsyth (politician) (1780–1841), American politician
 John Forsyth Jr. (1812–1877), American newspaper editor and son of the namesake politician
 John Duncan Forsyth (1886 or 1887–1963), Scottish-American architect

See also
 John Forsythe (1918–2010), American actor